The London Interdisciplinary School (LIS) is a university in Whitechapel, London. LIS was founded in 2017 and is the first new institution since the 1960s to hold full degree-awarding powers in the United Kingdom from inception. The School offers undergraduate and postgraduate degrees, as well as professional courses. LIS admitted its first cohort of undergraduate students in 2021, and will accept its first cohort of master's students in 2022.

Students on the interdisciplinary undergraduate degree follow a problem-based learning model studying complex problems through interdisciplinary teaching. They will graduate with a Bachelor of Arts and Science (BASc) in Interdisciplinary Problems and Methods.

Mission and ethos

Course design and work placements 
Rather than requiring students to specialise in a traditional academic subject, the LIS degree is centred on complex, real-world problems and the multiple disciplinary approaches required to address them. For example, plastic pollution may be addressed by studying a combination of chemistry, economics, ecology, and other topics. Over the course of a three-year full-time degree, undergraduate students examine problems, approaching each via ideas from relevant academic subjects. Potential topics include childhood obesity, the ethics of AI, knife crime, and climate change.

Each block of teaching also includes time spent on research methods, both quantitative and qualitative. The LIS approach also uses the idea of threshold concepts: the ideas that transform how a learner sees a topic and which are thought to lead to a deep understanding. There is also an emphasis on what the British academic Alan Wilson called "super-concepts": ideas like evolution and entropy that were developed in one field of research but have come to be used in many.

Admissions 
Prospective undergraduate students apply directly to LIS rather than through the university admissions service UCAS. Admissions decisions are not focused solely on grades but on each applicant's "background, circumstance and talent", though GCSEs and predicted A-Level grades or equivalent will still be taken into account. Every applicant is interviewed by a panel. LIS give out conditional, contextual offers which take into account each applicant's starting point in life.

Status 
LIS was registered at Companies House in 2017. An order by the Office for Students, the UK's regulator of higher education, gave LIS the power to award BASc (Hons) degrees in Interdisciplinary Problems and Methods from September 2021 onwards. This regulatory approval also allows students to pay fees using the national student loan scheme. As a teaching-focused institution, LIS takes part in the Teaching Excellence Framework but not the Research Excellence Framework.

The institution has raised money from philanthropists and investors including the founders of Innocent Drinks and the peer-to-peer funding platform Funding Circle. It was required to demonstrate financial security for at least five years as part of regulatory approval. It also receives public funding via the Future Fund, supported by the Treasury and the Department for Business, Energy and Industrial Strategy.

Founders and leadership 
LIS was co-founded by a handful of educationalists and entrepreneurs in 2017. The CEO, Ed Fidoe, was a manager at McKinsey & Company until leaving to co-found School 21 in 2012. School 21 is a London-based primary, secondary and high school that focuses on disadvantaged students and emphasises multi-disciplinary education and communication skills. The Chair, Christopher Persson, is an entrepreneur who co-founded the online restaurant reservation service Bookatable. Carl Gombrich, the Academic Lead, was a professor of Interdisciplinary Education at University College London and created its Bachelor of Arts and Sciences degree.

LIS has a Board of Directors providing oversight, an Academic Council, and an Executive Group which is responsible for operational issues. The board members include Andrew Mullinger, co-founder of Funding Circle; Mary Curnock Cook, former CEO of the national university admissions service UCAS; and writer and broadcaster Kenan Malik. There is also an advisory group which includes corporate leaders and the Chief Superintendent of the Metropolitan Police. Daisy Christodoulou, author of Seven Myths about Education, is also an advisor.

Reception 
LIS was given a Quality and Standards review by the Quality Assurance Agency for Higher Education in 2020. This looked at a range of issues, including course design, staffing, student involvement, and transparency. The report states that the institution met all the criteria that were assessed, with high confidence.

Paul Ashwin, Professor of Higher Education at Lancaster University, observes that the approach of the LIS has precedents in interdisciplinary polytechnic education and in the "new universities" created in the 1960s. He contrasts LIS' "coherent and carefully designed" approach against other attempts at interdisciplinary education that combine unrelated modules or which focus on generic skills. According to Ashwin "the underlying educational approach [of LIS] looks sound" but some elements of its marketing appeal to perceptions of "elite" higher education which themselves reinforce social inequality.

The philosopher Tom Whyman approves of the goal of a polymathic education to prepare students to address complex problems, but questions whether the LIS will be truly polymathic. Whyman stresses that these problems have a political dimension and that solving them might involve radical changes to existing institutions such as major corporations or the police. Hence, he argues, students face a conflict of interest when the same powerful institutions they could be reforming are involved in their education and work placement. Alex Beard, author of Natural Born Learners and director of the non-profit organisation Teach For All, says that the institution's choice of teaching staff "pitch[es] it firmly in the academic and rigorous, yet progressive and new space, which means it’s got a great chance of succeeding with students and policymakers alike."

The World Economic Forum characterised LIS as an "innovative new concept in higher education" which "is taking a new approach to teaching and learning, with a cross-curricular focus on tackling the most important problems facing the world." A leader in The Times observed "a familiar lament that the education system is too narrow for employers who need people who can solve complex problems that cut across traditional disciplinary boundaries" and described it as "encouraging" that corporations are supporting the LIS in its polymathic approach. "The Evening Standard has described LIS as a "revolutionary London university which aims to tackle real world problems". Forbes argues that the multidisciplinary approach championed by LIS is more relevant to today's world than traditional higher education, which was designed for the industrial age: "The number of companies backing the venture highlights the desire for employees with a very different skillset to that produced by universities today."

See also
List of universities in the United Kingdom
New College of the Humanities at Northeastern

References

External links 
 

Universities in London
Education in the United Kingdom
Universities in the United Kingdom
Education in London
Higher education in the United Kingdom